Kitekite Falls (also called Kitakita Falls) is a scenic 3-tiered waterfall near Auckland, New Zealand. They are located on the Glen Esk stream near Piha Beach.

History

The area close to Kitekite Falls was milled for kauri from 1910, when logs were flushed downstream to the Piha Mill. The mill operated adjacent to the waterfall (downstream at the site of Stedfast Park) until 1921. All the mature trees in the area were cut down. At the top of the falls, it is clear to see the notches in the rocks (rectangular cutouts for large pieces of wood to rest in). This was the location of the Glen Esk dam. The first attempt to drive logs down the falls resulted in their destruction on the rocks below and the dam was thereafter only used to flush the logs waiting in the stream below down to the mill. The remains of the heavy beams used can still be found in the stream today although they tend to move from time to time. In 2007 a beam fell, broke and half of it wedged itself into rocks at the base of the three tiered falls.

Kitekite Falls walk
The walk reopened Boxing Day 2018 with more covered walkways to protect the kauri. It had been closed to the public due to kauri dieback and under  from Te Kawerau ā Maki in conjunction with the Waitākere Ranges Local Board and Auckland Council.
From the carpark at the end of Glenesk Road, directions are clearly signposted.

A loop track, used by around 30,000 people a year (2005), follows the Glen Esk Stream with minor undulations (on the south side) up to a lookout with a large Macrocarpa bench seat, made by offenders doing community work (2005). The track then descends down wooden steps to the base of the falls (40 minutes from the carpark). The track then crosses the stream next to the lower swimming hole and returns down the north side. Walkers can also climb a reasonably steep track (the Connect Track), which begins about 100m from the base of the falls on the northern side of the stream. It takes about 15 minutes to get to the top of the falls. There is a swimming hole at the top.

Local flora and fauna

It has taken many decades for the young kauri (Agathis australis), known as 'rickers', to regenerate and finally begin to emerge through the forest canopy again. Many sharp-pointed, cone-shaped rickers can be seen from the Kitekite loop track near the falls. At about 100 years old, kauri begin to develop a spreading crown. It is now approaching 100 years since milling stopped. The crowns generally continue to expand for a further 500 years.

The walk to the falls progresses through a patch of nikau palms where the call of the tūī is frequently heard from above. Other native plants include silver tree-ferns, pūriri trees whose red berries attract kererū (native pigeon), and the rangiora plant (termed 'bushman's friend' due to the soft underside of its broad leaf). The falls have been identified as a site of a rare moss Fissidens rigidulus var. pseudostrictus.

New Zealand longfin eel, (Anguilla dieffenbachii) hide among the rocks around the base of the falls.

Place names
The name 'Kitekite' is likely a misspelling. While sometimes listed as Kitakita, Te Kawerau ā Maki kaumātua Rewi Spraggon believes the traditional name was Ketekete, referring to a clicking sound made before an ambush.

'Glen Esk' stream was named by William Stockwell. He emigrated to New Zealand in 1876 and bought land above Kitekite Falls soon after his arrival. He named the area 'Glen Esk' because it reminded him of his homeland in Scotland. 'Glen', from Gaelic, an Indo-European language spoken in Scotland and Ireland, means 'valley'. 'Esk' is of Celtic origin and means 'water'.

Canyoning
The falls are used for canyoning by an Auckland Regional Parks licensed operator. The issuing of the licence was a 'hot issue' at the 2002 AGM of the Piha Ratepayers and Residents Association where residents voiced concern over the environmental impact to the Kitekite Falls. However, ARC recreation coordinator Lee Whiley said there were no concerns. This recreational activity continues to this day under close monitoring by council. Climbing on the falls (going off track) is strictly prohibited and can only be done with a permit or licensed guide. Restrictions are in place to protect the rare moss growing in the wet areas of the waterfall.

See also
Waterfalls of New Zealand

References

External links 
 Piha at the Auckland Council
KiteKite Falls at World of Waterfalls

Waterfalls of New Zealand
Tourist attractions in the Auckland Region
Landforms of the Auckland Region
Waitākere Ranges
West Auckland, New Zealand